Myriophyllum implicatum is a species of water milfoil in the family Haloragaceae. It is native to north-eastern Australia (to New South Wales and Queensland).

It was first described in 1986 by Anthony Orchard.

In New South Wales, it is listed as critically endangered, but under the Nature Conservation Act 1992 of Queensland it is listed as of least concern.

Description
Myriophyllum implicatum is a creeping dioecious herb, which roots freely at its nodes. The alternate leaves are linear and entire and from 2.5 mm to 5 mm long. The flowers are axillary  with the male flowers having a short pedicel, while the female flowers are sessile. The red-purple fruit is sessile and cube shaped.

References

External links
Myriophyllum implicatum: Images & occurrence data from GBIF

implicatum
Freshwater plants
Flora of Australia
Plants described in 1986